Robert Ferguson (1 April 1817 – 1 September 1898) was an English mill-owner from Cumberland, antiquarian and Liberal politician, who sat in the House of Commons from 1874 to 1886.

Biography
Ferguson was the son of Joseph Ferguson of Ferguson Brothers cotton manufacturers and his wife Maria Isabella Clarke daughter of John Clarke of Bebside House Northumberland., His father's company owned the Holme Head Works textile mills in Denton Holme. Ferguson became a partner in the firm of Ferguson Brothers and was at one time a  Major in the 1st Battalion Cumberland Rifle Volunteers. He was Mayor of Carlisle in 1855 and 1858. He was also chairman of the Carlisle School Board and president of the Carlisle Mechanics Institute.
  
Ferguson was elected MP for Carlisle in February 1874. His father had also held the seat from 1852 to 1857. Ferguson held the seat until 1886. At the General election he retired from politics.

Ferguson funded the Robert Ferguson Primary school at Denton Holme, which was opened in 1880 and which was enlarged twice in his lifetime. He lived at Morton Manor, which was later to become Chance's Park.

Ferguson was also an antiquarian and a Fellow of the Society of Antiquaries. He died on 1 September 1898 aged 81.

Works
Ferguson was the author of several books, including:
The shadow of the pyramid, a series of sonnets (1847)
The Northmen in Cumberland & Westmoreland (1856) 
The Teutonic name-system applied to the family names of France, England, & Germany (1864)
Surnames as a Science (1883)

References

External links
 
 
 

1817 births
1898 deaths
Liberal Party (UK) MPs for English constituencies
UK MPs 1874–1880
UK MPs 1880–1885
UK MPs 1885–1886
Mayors of Carlisle, Cumbria